was a Japanese engineer, known for his contributions in hydraulic engineering in the Japanese-ruled Taiwan. Hatta was born in Kanazawa, Ishikawa. After graduating from Tokyo Imperial University in 1910, he joined the Seat of Governor-General of Taiwan, served as a technician of the government. He was the designer of Chianan Canal and Wusanto Reservoir.

He was killed on board the transport ship Taiyō Maru, when it was torpedoed and sunk on May 8, 1942 by US submarine Grenadier.

In contemporary Taiwan he is honored as a deity for his contributions to irrigation.

See also
Pattenrai!! ~ Minami no Shima no Mizu Monogatari

References

External links
八田與一アーカイブス - Japan Society of Civil Engineers, JSCE Library
Yoichi Hatta bio

1886 births
1942 deaths
People from Kanazawa, Ishikawa
20th-century Japanese engineers
Hydraulic engineers
University of Tokyo alumni